Out of Love may refer to:

 Out of Love (1988 film), a 1988 British television film by Tom Clarke
 Out of Love (2016 film), a 2016 film by Paloma Aguilera Valdebenito selected for the Riviera International Film Festival
 Out of Love (TV series), a 2019 Indian television series
 Out of Love (Australian TV series), a 1974 Australian TV series starring Patsy King
 Out of Love (album), a 2011 studio album by Mister Heavenly
 "Out of Love", a song by Smash Mouth from the album Magic, 2012
 "Out of Love" (Alessia Cara song), 2019
 Out of Love (Lil Tecca song), 2020